Topmost was a Finnish rock band founded in 1964, becoming the most popular band in Finland in 1967. Its members were Heimo "Holle" Holopainen (bass guitar, background vocals), Kristian "Kisu" Jernström (drums, background vocals), Vasilij "Gugi" Kokljuschkin (vocals), Eero Lupari (guitar, background vocals), Harri Saksala (vocals, saxophone), Arto "Poku" Tarkkonen (keyboards).

The band's most popular hits were Finnish translations of English language songs: "" ("Black Is Black" by Los Bravos), "" ("A Whiter Shade of Pale" by Procol Harum) and "" ("Two Kinds of Lovers" by The Gibsons).

Topmost split in 1968. Holopainen, Lupari and Saksala continued in the band Apollo.

Singles discography 
 The In Crowd / Alone And Forsaken (1966)
  / Eleanor Rigby (1966)
 Two Kinds Of Lovers / Candy Girl (1967)
  /  (1967)
  /  (1967)
  /  (1968)

Albums discography 
 Topmost (1968) 
 Topmost Collection (LP, 1988)
 Topmost Collection (CD, 2001)

References

External links 
Unofficial fan site

Finnish musical groups
Musical groups established in 1964